Saint Leontius (Saint Léonce) (d. ca. 430 AD) was a bishop of Autun during the fifth century.  His feast day is 1 July.  He is mentioned in the Martyrologium Hieronymianum.  He is sometimes confused with the similarly named Saint Leonorius (Saint Leonore, Lunaire).

External links
 Leontius von Autun

Bishops of Autun
5th-century bishops in Gaul
5th-century Christian saints